Perry High School is a public secondary school in Perry, Oklahoma, United States. It is located at 900 Fir Street in Perry, Oklahoma and the only high school in Perry Public Schools.

Extracurricular activities

Clubs and organizations

4-H
FCA
FFA
National Honor Society
Quiz Bowl
Student Council
SWAT
Yearbook

Athletics
Basketball
Baseball
Cheerleading
Cross Country
Football
Golf
Softball
Tennis
Track
Wrestling

References

External links
 

Public high schools in Oklahoma
Schools in Noble County, Oklahoma